This is a list of fellows of the Royal Society elected in 1980.

Fellows

Montague Mattinson Pennell  (1916–1981)
John Arthur Shercliff  (1927–1983)
William Henry Wittrick  (1922–1986)
Herbert Williams Smith  (1919–1987)
Richard Evelyn Donohue Bishop  (1925–1989)
Walter Thompson Welford  (1916–1990)
Niels Kaj Jerne  (1911–1994)
Hannes Olof Gosta Alfven  (1908–1995)
John Burns Brooksby  (1914–1998)
Zbigniew Stanislaw Basinski  (1928–1999)
Henry Ellis Daniels  (1912–2000)
William Donald Hamilton  (1936–2000)
Frederick Gerard Friedlander  (1917–2001)
Douglas Hugh Everett  (1916–2002)
Paul Moritz Cohn  (d. 2006)
James Philip Elliott  (d. 2008)
Walter Eric Spear  (d. 2008)
Sir Alan Marshall Muir Wood  (d. 2009)
Sir Graham Collingwood Liggins  (d. 2010)
William Fleming Hoggan Jarrett  (1928–2012)
Kenneth Henderson Jack  (d. 2013)
Muhammad Akhtar
Philip Warren Anderson
Donald Charlton Bradley
Brian Edgar Scourse Gunning
Marshall Davidson Hatch
Leslie Lars Iversen
Alan Roy Katritzky
Thomas Walter Bannerman Kibble
Sir Anthony Seymour Laughton
Richard Maitland Laws
Sir Anthony James Leggett
Anthony William Linnane
Roger Parsons
Sir George Karoly Radda
Humphrey Peter Rang
Sir Mark Henry Richmond
Sir Derek Harry Roberts
Louis Siminovitch
Grenville Turner
Lawrence Weiskrantz
Lewis Wolpert

References

1980
1980 in science
1980 in the United Kingdom